Riegel am Kaiserstuhl (Latin Rigola) is a municipality in the district of Emmendingen in Baden-Württemberg, Germany. It lies 8 km northwest of Emmendingen, and is accessed by the motorway A5 (Karlsruhe - Basel).

Education
Riegel provides its citizens education with the Michaelschule that consists of both a Grund- and a Hauptschule.

Roman ruins
A Mithraeum was unearthed in the residential neighborhoods of Riegel.  A reconstruction of the temple was placed there, and the original artifacts can be seen at the museum in Freiburg im Breisgau.

Municipal partnership
Champhol, Eure-et-Loir, France, since 1995

Museum
The Kunsthalle Messmer is a museum exhibiting art from the 20th and 21st century. It is located in a former brewery building and includes a sculpture garden.
The museum of the municipality exhibits excavations of the Roman village and reconstructed models. Furtheron there is a part on the development of jet-propulsion of rockets with objects pictures, films and text

References

External links
Riegel am Kaiserstuhl: pictures & history (German)
Riegel am Kaiserstuhl: actual and historical pictures

Emmendingen (district)